Aleksandru Robert Longher (born 8 June 2000) is a Romanian professional footballer who plays as a midfielder for Liga II club Unirea Constanța.

Club career

Dinamo București
Longher made his debut in Liga I in November 2017, for Dinamo București.

Botoșani
On 6 August 2019, Longher signed a contract for three years with Botoșani.

Politehnica Iași
On 20 January 2020, Longher joined Liga I side Politehnica Iași.

References

External links
 
 

2000 births
Living people
Sportspeople from Suceava
Romanian people of Polish descent
Romanian footballers
Association football midfielders
Liga I players
Liga II players
FC Dinamo București players
FC Botoșani players
FC Politehnica Iași (2010) players
LPS HD Clinceni players
FC Unirea Constanța players